Alagaan Natin Ating Kalusugan, also known as the Anakalusugan Party List (stylized as AnaKalusugan) is a health advocacy group with representation in the House of Representatives of the Philippines. It aims to represent the Philippines' health sector.

History

18th Congress
During the 18th Congress, Anakalusugan had Mike Defensor as its representative. Defensor proposed the passage of Free Annual Medical Checkup Act that would mandate the government to provide free annual medical examinations to Filipinos. Anakalusugan also played a part in the House of Representatives' probe against Philhealth regarding a corruption scandal involving funds worth billions of pesos in 2020. 

Amid the COVID-19 pandemic, Defensor along with Sagip Party-list representative Rodante Marcoleta initiated an event called "ivermectin pan-three" that distributes the anti-parasitic drug ivermectin, despite warnings from the World Health Organization on the lack of evidence to support ivermectin's efficacy against COVID-19.

Electoral performance

Representatives to Congress

References

Party-lists represented in the House of Representatives of the Philippines
Political organizations based in the Philippines
Medical and health organizations based in the Philippines